Canoa is a town in the Canton of San Vicente in the Manabí Province of Ecuador.

Canoa is located north of Bahía de Caraquez, Province of Manabí – Ecuador. Local stories and tales say that the natives of Canoa hid deep in the hills when they saw invaders approaching, leaving the beautiful beach deserted. 100 years later, Jesuit priests arrived and along with Canoans, they celebrated the birth of yet another Spanish community.

In its beginnings, Canoa was called Pantaguas o Pintagua. Juan de Velasco, a priest, was the first to include Canoa in a map of the old Reino de Quito (Kingdom of Quito). At the turn of the 20th century, the beach was officially recognized and became part of the Cantón Sucre (Bahía de Caraquez). Canoa was registered as part of the Cantón San Vicente at the end of the 20th century.

The town suffered extensive damage during the 2016 Ecuador earthquake.

Sources 

Populated places in Manabí Province